Jesse Te Ahukaramu Royal (born 22 March 1980) is a professional rugby league footballer from New Zealand who currently plays for the Kurri Kurri Bulldogs in the Newcastle Rugby League. He has previously played in the NRL for the Newcastle Knights and New Zealand Warriors. Royal's preferred rugby league position is prop forward.

Early years
Royal was born in Hamilton, New Zealand. He was a chef in the New Zealand Army and has played in the Bartercard Cup for the Central Falcons and represented Waikato. He captained the 2003 New Zealand A tour of England.

Australia
Royal was signed by the Penrith Panthers which prompted a move to Australia in 2004 to play for the club's NSWRL Premier League team. In 2005 he joined the Newcastle Knights on a two-year deal, however he was not able to break out of Premier League. His form was good enough however to earn a new two-year deal which eventually led to his first grade debut in 2007. He went on to play 29 games for the Knights.

Warriors
In 2009, Royal initially decided to explore employment opportunities in the coalmine industry, whilst also playing for the Kurri Kurri club, in order to spend more time with his young family. However he later signed a two-year deal with the New Zealand Warriors that same year to provide injury cover for Evarn Tuimavave. He made his Warriors debut in Round Two 2009 against the Manly Sea Eagles, scoring a try with his first touch of the ball.

Later years
Royal decided to retire after the 2010 NRL season and return to Newcastle resume his employment in the mining industry, and to play for local club Kurri Kurri Bulldogs.

References

1980 births
Living people
Auckland rugby league team players
Bay Roskill Vikings players
Kurri Kurri Bulldogs players
Manawatu rugby league team players
New Zealand Army personnel
New Zealand rugby league players
New Zealand Māori rugby league players
New Zealand people of Scottish descent
Newcastle Knights players
New Zealand Warriors players
Rugby league players from Hamilton, New Zealand
Rugby league props
Waikato rugby league team players